Orndoff-Cross House, also known as the Henry Orndoff House, is a historic home located at Martinsburg, Berkeley County, West Virginia. It was built about 1796 and consists of a log house with additions.  The earliest addition dates from about 1830 and the latest from the 1990s. It is a two-story vernacular residence topped by a standing seam metal, side gable roof.  Also on the property is a meat-hanging shed of log construction (c. 1796).

It was listed on the National Register of Historic Places in 2010.

References

Houses on the National Register of Historic Places in West Virginia
Houses in Berkeley County, West Virginia
Buildings and structures in Martinsburg, West Virginia
National Register of Historic Places in Martinsburg, West Virginia
Houses completed in 1796
1796 establishments in Virginia